June Casagrande (born 1966) is an American writer who specializes in English grammar and language usage. She writes a syndicated column on language called "A Word Please", and is the author of five books; her 2018 The Joy of Syntax was described as "a succinct and mercifully lucid summing-up of the basics" of grammar by copy editor John McIntyre.

Publications
Grammar Snobs Are Great Big Meanies (2006)
Mortal Syntax (2008)
It Was the Best of Sentences, It Was the Worst of Sentences (2010)
The Best Punctuation Book, Period (2014)
The Joy of Syntax (2018)

References

External links

1966 births
Living people
Linguists from the United States
Women linguists